Siniša Stamenković may refer to:

 Siniša Stamenković (Serbian politician, born 1945), Serbian parliamentarian (1993-97) and former mayor of Gadžin Han
 Siniša Stamenković (Serbian politician, born 1949), Serbian parliamentarian (2008-12)